Nationality words link to articles with information on the nation's poetry or literature (for instance, Irish or France).

Events
 July – English "peasant poet" John Clare first enters an asylum for the insane, at High Beach in Essex.
 October – The United States Magazine and Democratic Review is established by John L. O'Sullivan, a political and literary magazine that publishes Walt Whitman, Henry David Thoreau and others.

Works in English

United Kingdom
 Richard Harris Barham's Ingoldsby Legends
 Lord Byron, Dramas (poetry, despite the title)
 Eliza Cook's The Old Armchair
 Lady Mary Wortley Montagu, Letters and Works, including introductory anecdotes by Lady Louisa Stuart (See also Works 1803)
 Thomas Love Peacock's The Paper Money Lyrics
 Robert Southey, The Poetical Works of Robert Southey, first two volumes published this year; second two volumes published in 1838
 Letitia Elizabeth Landon, writing under the pen name "L.E.L." Fisher's Drawing Room Scrap Book, 1838

United States
 Thomas Holley Chivers, Nacoochee
 George Moses Horton's Hope of Liberty — Poems by a Slave, a second edition of Hope of Liberty, originally published in  1829; the new edition was published in Philadelphia by an antislavery group; Horton received no royalties (although the North Carolina slave was trying to earn money for his freedom), and likely didn't even know that this and another edition had been published in Boston in 1838); contains 23 poems, including three on the author's feelings about having been a slave;
 Frederick William Shelton, The Trollopiad; or, Travelling Gentlemen in America, a verse satire on British travel writer Frances Trollope, who wrote harshly about Americans in her Domestic Manners of the Americans 1832
 John Greenleaf Whittier, Poems Written During the Progress of the Abolition Question in the United States, the author's first poetry book, published in an unauthorized edition by Boston abolitionists; the next year, Whittier expanded the collection and published it under the title Poems; includes poems attacking slavery, such as "Clerical Oppressors", which focuses on Southern church leaders who use Christianity to defend slavery, and "Stanzas", on the irony of America's commitments to both freedom and slavery

Works published in other languages
 Victor Hugo, Les Voix intérieures, France
 José de Espronceda, El estudiante de Salamanca, first fragment, Spain
 Alphonse de Lamartine's Chute d'un ange, France
 Charles-Augustin Sainte-Beuve, Les Pensées d'août, France

Births
Death years link to the corresponding "[year] in poetry" article:
 January 30 – Augusta Webster, born Julia Augusta Davies (died 1894), English
 February 24 – Rosalía de Castro (died 1885), Spanish Galician poet and writer
 March 1 – William Dean Howells (died 1920), American writer, editor and critic
 March 18 – Eliza A. Pittsinger (died 1908), American, "The California Poetess"
 April 1 – Jorge Isaacs, born Jorge Isaacs Ferrer (died 1895), Colombian writer, politician and explorer
 April 5 – Algernon Charles Swinburne (died 1909), English
 April 10 – Forceythe Willson, born Byron Forceythe Willson (died 1867), American
 July 14 – Estella Hijmans-Hertzveld (died 1881), Dutch
 September 8 – Joaquin Miller, born Cincinnatus Heine Miller (died 1913), American "Poet of the Sierras"
 Undated – Ram Sharma (died 1918), Indian, English-language poet and journalist

Deaths
Birth years link to the corresponding "[year] in poetry" article:
 January 29 – Alexander Pushkin (born 1799), Russian poet, killed in a duel
 June 14 – Giacomo Leopardi (born 1798), Italian poet, philosopher, essayist and philologist
 March 15 – Lukijan Mušicki (born 1777), Serbian poet, prose writer and polyglot
 September 8 – Sir Samuel Egerton Brydges (born 1762), English
 October 17 – George Colman the Younger (born 1762), English dramatist and miscellaneous writer
 October 19 – Hendrik Doeff (born 1764), Dutch trader, the first westerner to write haiku in Japanese
 November 11 – Thomas Green Fessenden (born 1771), American

See also

 19th century in poetry
 19th century in literature
 List of years in poetry
 List of years in literature
 Victorian literature
 French literature of the 19th century
 Biedermeier era of German literature
 Golden Age of Russian Poetry (1800–1850)
 Young Germany (Junges Deutschland) a loose group of German writers from about 1830 to 1850
 List of poets
 Poetry
 List of poetry awards

Notes

19th-century poetry
Poetry